John Charles Burdett (13 March 1928 – 25 November 1993) was an Australian politician. He was a Liberal member of the South Australian Legislative Council from 1973 to 1993; he died shortly before he was due to retire at the general election. He was Minister for Consumer Affairs and Community Welfare from 1979 to 1982.

References

1928 births
1993 deaths
Liberal Party of Australia members of the Parliament of South Australia
Members of the South Australian Legislative Council
Place of birth missing
20th-century Australian politicians